Markaryd Municipality (Markaryds kommun) is a municipality in south-west Kronoberg County in southern Sweden, where the town Markaryd is seat.

In 1916 a part of the rural municipality of Markaryd was detached from it, forming a market town (köping) with the same name. The two entities were reunited in 1960. The present municipality was created in 1971, when Traryd and Markaryd were amalgamated.

Geography 
The nature is mainly dominated by forests, as usually in Småland, but there are also significant agricultural areas. Stretching from the northern to the southern parts is the river Lagan, making up the foundation of the water system with opportunities for fishing, canoeing and camping. There are also specific areas created for walks in forest and wildlife nature, and just east of the town Markaryd is a possibility for moose safari, arranged by Smalandet.

The European route E4 motorway goes just by the town of Markaryd and also the other town Strömsnäsbruk.

Localities
There are 4 urban areas (also called a tätort or locality) in Markaryd Municipality.

In the table the localities are listed according to the size of the population as of 31 December 2005. The municipal seat is in bold characters.

References
Statistics Sweden

External links

Markaryd Municipality - Official site
Smalandet
Coat of arms

Municipalities of Kronoberg County